The 2016–17 1. FSV Mainz 05 II season is the 25th season in the football club's history. Mainz 05 II now play in the 3. Liga.

Players

Squad

Competitions

3. Liga

League table

Results summary

Results by round

Matches

References

External links
 1. FSV Mainz 05 II at Weltfussball.de 

1. FSV Mainz 05 seasons
Mainz II